The Flux Foundation is a non-profit group based in the San Francisco Bay Area whose main objective is to build community through the creation of large-scale public art. The group creates both public art and public artists. It was founded on April 1, 2010 and was established as a California corporation on January 6, 2011, by Rebecca Anders, Jessica Hobbs, Peter (PK) Kimelman, Catherine Magee and Colinne Hemrich.

The Flux Foundation's works are notable not only for their scale but interactivity with the audience relying on participation to create atmospheric effects. The group draws upon Situationist and Fluxus ideas of creating spectacle to establish social connections as an effect of the artwork. This "community creation" is mirrored in the pieces' creation by a large-number of volunteers who themselves create new social networks. The Foundation also provides mentorship and fiscal sponsorship to other large-scale artists.

Foundation
Flux is administratively based in San Francisco, while its studios are located at American Steel Studios in West Oakland, California. As of 2016, the Board of Directors consists of Kimelman, Hobbs, Magee, Paul Belger and Thwen Chaloemtiarana. It is a "public charity" 501c(3) non-profit, supported by grants, public donations and the display of its artworks.

Projects / Artworks

 The Temple of Flux is the seminal project of the foundation.  The temple was built over the course of four months, the initial stages of its creation took place in the American Steel Warehouse in Oakland, California.  The projects construction was completed in August 2010 at Black Rock City, during the Burning Man Festival. After standing for a mere 9 days, the piece was burned at the festival's conclusion in a choreographed performance of flame effects.
 Fishbug/Chimera Sententia 2.0 - 2009/2011 (continues to be exhibited)
 Spire of Wishes - 2010 (originally shown at the Bentley Reserve in San Francisco, now in a private collection in Sonoma County)
 BrollyFlock! - 2011
 The Fluxcycles: Fluxicleta - 2011, Dragon Wagon - 2012, Poppy Wagon - 2014  (continue to be exhibited)
 Colony - 2012 (commissioned for the Annual Meeting of the American Association of museums, acquired by the Skirball Center, Los Angeles)
 TweetHaus OAK - 2012. (an educational project with Park Day school in which birdhouses were constructed for the Western bluebird as a vehicle for instruction in ecology and collaborative art)
 Zoa - 2012 (Burning Man Honorarium, continues to be exhibited)
 The Sidewalk's End - 2013 (installation at the Coachella Music & Art Festival, now in a private collection in Humboldt County)
 Canopy - 2013 (installation at Hamilton Hall, University of the Arts, Philadelphia)
 Carousel - 2014 (installation for Harvard Graduate School of Education's Project Zero Conference)
 Bloom! - 2015 (commissioned by the Philadelphia Zoo, continues to be exhibited)
 Lacuna - 2015 (commissioned by the Bay Area Festival of the Book, exhibited annually)
 Dreamland - 2015 (Burning Man Honorarium, continues to be exhibited)

Outside of art

In late July 2010,  PayPal froze the account which the foundation operated for donations to the Temple project.  After submitting requested documentation to the IRS and to PayPal the foundation was unable to access the account for four days, there was no clear expectation as to how or when the issue could be resolved.  The San Francisco Bay Guardian broke the story, which lit a firestorm of dissent towards the online financial facilitator.  The day following the Guardian article PayPal granted the foundation a one time opportunity to withdraw funds from the account.  Although PayPal refused to comment, it would appear the offer was made as a result of a backlash of negative media attention, with CNN, Fast Company and other media outlets picking up the story.

Exhibitions & Lectures

The Foundation has exhibited at several art and music festivals, including Maker Faire, Coachella, Burning Man, the Electric Daisy Carnival, Nocturnal Festival, Beyond Wonderland and others. Principals have spoken on Flux's work at TED, SXSW, the Exploratorium, the Annual Meeting of the American Association of Museums, Maker Faire and several universities.

References

 http://fluxfoundation.org/
 http://www.americansteelstudios.com/
 http://fishbug.net
 http://www.sfbg.com/2010/08/31/burners-flux?page=0,0
 http://www.fastcompany.com/1680570/burning-man-defeat-paypal

Public art in the United States
Non-profit organizations based in California